Admiral John Dalrymple (1722 – 10 October 1798) was an officer of the Royal Navy. He became a fellow of the Royal Society.

Naval career
He entered the Royal Navy as a captain's servant aboard . He passed his examinations for promotion to lieutenant in 1744. He commanded a sloop in 1757; and he was promoted to post-captain in 1758. He was promoted to the rank of rear-admiral in 1787 and to vice-admiral in 1793. He was Commander-in-Chief, The Nore from 11 May 1794, flying his flag aboard . He was promoted to full admiral in 1795.

This Scottish-born seaman was elected to membership in the Royal Society on 23 May 1796.

References

Fellows of the Royal Society
Year of birth missing
1798 deaths
Royal Navy vice admirals
Royal Navy personnel of the War of the Austrian Succession
Royal Navy personnel of the Seven Years' War
Royal Navy personnel of the American Revolutionary War
Royal Navy personnel of the French Revolutionary Wars